Artemyev or Artemiev and Artemyeva / Artemieva (feminine) is a  Russian surname, derived from the given name Artemy. Notable people with the surname include:

Eduard Artemyev (1937–2022), Russian composer
Igor Artemyev (born 1961), Russian politician and government official
Valentina Artemyeva (born 1986), Russian breaststroke swimmer
Vasily Artemyev (born 1987), Russian rugby union wing
Vladimir Artemyev (1885–1962), Soviet rocket scientist
Vladislav Artemiev (born 1998), Russian chess grandmaster and prodigy

See also
Artem'ev (crater)

References

Russian-language surnames
Patronymic surnames
Surnames from given names